The 2014 Philippine Basketball Association (PBA) Governors' Cup, also known as the 2014 PLDT Home TelPad-PBA Governors' Cup for sponsorship reasons, was the third and last conference of the 2013–14 PBA season. The conference began on May 18 and ended on July 9, 2014.

The tournament is an import-laden format, which requires an import or a pure-foreign player for each team, The recruited imports must be not taller than 6 feet and 5 inches for every team.

Games in the tournament are televised by TV5 and AksyonTV; games are also being simulcast in high definition through a special channel exclusive to Cignal Digital TV subscribers.

Format
The tournament format for this conference is as follows:
 Single-round robin eliminations; 9 games per team; Teams are then seeded by basis on win–loss records. 
Top eight teams will advance to the quarterfinals. Ties are broken among head-to-head records of the tied teams.
Quarterfinals (higher seed with the twice to beat advantage):
QF1: #1 seed vs #8 seed
QF2: #2 seed vs #7 seed
QF3: #3 seed vs #6 seed
QF4: #4 seed vs #5 seed
Semifinals (best-of-5 series):
SF1: QF1 vs. QF4 winners
SF2: QF2 vs. QF3 winners
Finals (best-of-5 series)
Winners of the semifinals

Due to the need to finish the season and the tournament by June in order for the Gilas Pilipinas team to train for the upcoming FIBA Asia Cup in July, the FIBA World Cup in August and the Asian Games in September, the league had six playing dates per week and the quotient system was implemented for tiebreakers, instead of playoff games for the #4 and #8 seeds.

Elimination round

Team standings

Schedule

Results

Bracket

Quarterfinals

(1) Talk 'N Text vs. (8) Barako Bull

(2) Rain or Shine vs. (7) Air21

(3) Alaska vs. (6) Barangay Ginebra

(4) San Mig Super Coffee vs. (5) San Miguel

Semifinals

(1) Talk 'N Text vs. (4) San Mig Super Coffee

(2) Rain or Shine vs. (3) Alaska

Finals

Awards

Conference
Best Player of the Conference: Ranidel de Ocampo (Talk 'N Text Tropang Texters)
Best Import of the Conference: Arizona Reid (Rain or Shine Elasto Painters)
Finals MVP: James Yap (San Mig Super Coffee Mixers)

Players of the Week

Imports 
The following is the list of imports which had played for their respective teams at least once, with the returning imports in italics. Highlighted are the imports who stayed with their respective teams for the whole conference.

References

PBA Governors' Cup
Governors' Cup